Cristian Nicolae Vlad (born 18 February 1977 in Boldești-Scăeni, Prahova County) is a retired Romanian football player. He played as a midfielder.

Club career

He made his debut in the Divizia A at 20 years old for Petrolul Ploiești where he played until the 1999/2000 season.

His next destination was Dinamo București where he did not make a great impact.

In 2007, he returned to Petrolul Ploiești where he helped the team until his retirement in 2011.

Honours
Dinamo București
Romanian League Championship: 1999–00
Romanian Cup: 1999-00, 2000–01
Astra Ploiești
Romanian Third League: 2007–08
Petrolul Ploieşti
Romanian Second League: 2010–11

References

External links

1977 births
Living people
People from Prahova County
Romanian footballers
Association football goalkeepers
Liga I players
FC Unirea Urziceni players
FC Petrolul Ploiești players
FC Dinamo București players
ASC Oțelul Galați players
FC Argeș Pitești players
ACF Gloria Bistrița players
CSM Ceahlăul Piatra Neamț players
FC Astra Giurgiu players
CS Inter Gaz București players
Association football midfielders